
Gmina Zaniemyśl is a rural gmina (administrative district) in Środa Wielkopolska County, Greater Poland Voivodeship, in west-central Poland.

Villages
Gmina Zaniemyśl contains the villages and settlements of Bożydar, Brzostek, Czarnotki, Dębice, Dobroczyn Drugi, Dobroczyn Pierwszy, Doliwiec Leśny, Jaszkowo, Jeziorskie Huby, Jeziory Małe, Jeziory Wielkie, Józefowo, Kępa Mała, Kępa Wielka, Konstantynowo, Kowalka, Łękno, Luboniec, Lubonieczek, Ludwikowo, Mądre, Majdany, Pigłowice, Płaczki, Polesie, Polwica, Polwica-Huby, Potachy, Śnieciska, Winna, Wyszakowo, Wyszakowskie Huby, Zaniemyśl, Zofiówka and Zwola.

Neighbouring gminas
Gmina Zaniemyśl is bordered by the gminas of Kórnik, Krzykosy, Książ Wielkopolski, Śrem and Środa Wielkopolska.

References
Polish official population figures 2006

Zaniemysl
Środa Wielkopolska County